The Madonna and Child with the Infant John the Baptist is a 1513–1514 painting by the Italian artist Correggio.

It was painted by a young Carreggio in the city of Parma, remote from the immediate influences of traditional Renaissance art, although aspects of its style are reminiscent of Raphael, Leonardo da Vinci and the burgeoning Dutch masters.

After passing through a number of hands it was bought by Messrs Wildenstein for the Art Institute of Chicago in 1965. Although stolen shortly afterwards, it was soon recovered and still hangs there.

References

1514 paintings
John the Baptist, Chicago
Paintings in the collection of the Art Institute of Chicago
Stolen works of art